Zeta Apodis, Latinized from ζ Apodis, is the Bayer designation for a star in the southern constellation of Apus. It has an apparent visual magnitude of +4.78, which is bright enough to allow it to be seen with the naked eye.

The spectrum of Zeta Apodis matches a stellar classification of K2 III, with the luminosity class of III indicating it is an evolved giant star. At the estimated distance of Eta Draconis, this yields a physical size of about 11 times the radius of the Sun. The outer atmosphere has an effective temperature of 4,388 K, which gives it the orange-hued glow of a K-type star.

Naming

References 

156277
Apodis, Zeta
Apus (constellation)
K-type giants
084969
6417
Durchmusterung objects